Transportes Aéreos del Mercosur S.A, d/b/a LATAM Airlines Paraguay (formerly known as TAM Paraguay and previously Líneas Aéreas Paraguayas) is the flag carrier and the national airline of Paraguay with its headquarters in Asunción, Paraguay. Its flights operate from Silvio Pettirossi International Airport in Asunción. Its parent company is LATAM Airlines Group.

History

The airline was established on November 17, 1962 and started operations in 1963 as Líneas Aéreas Paraguayas. The airline then operated for a brief period between 1995 and 1996 as a subsidiary of the Ecuadorian airline SAETA under the name LAPSA Air Paraguay.

On September 1, 1996, Aerolíneas Paraguayas (a subsidiary of TAM Linhas Aéreas) purchased 80% of the majority shares of the airline, which by then both airlines were merged under the name TAM – Transportes Aéreos del Mercosur. It was then sold to TAM Linhas Aéreas later that year on October 6, which used two Fokker 100 jets to cover regional destinations.

In March 2008, following a branding strategy, the name TAM Mercosur was dropped and the airline adopted a corporate identity identical to its Brazilian owner. However, its corporate structure remained the same. The airline was rebranded as LATAM Paraguay following the merger and creation of the LATAM Airlines Group and the subsequent rebranding of its member airlines. Today LATAM owns 94.98% and the Paraguayan Government 5.02% of the shares.

Destinations
, LATAM Paraguay offers or has previously offered scheduled flights to the following destinations:

 
a.Route operated by Paranair on behalf of LATAM Paraguay as wet-lease.

Codeshare agreement
LATAM Paraguay codeshares with the following airlines:
Paranair

Fleet

Current fleet
As of October 2019, LATAM Paraguay operates flights using the following aircraft:

Former fleet

The airline previously operated the following aircraft:

See also
List of airlines of Paraguay

References

External links
LATAM Airlines

Airlines of Paraguay
Latin American and Caribbean Air Transport Association
Airlines established in 1962
P
Paraguayan brands
1962 establishments in Paraguay
Former Star Alliance affiliate members